Charles Ernest Teather (24 January 1889 – 26 April 1948) was an Australian rules footballer who played with Essendon in the Victorian Football League (VFL).

Notes

External links 

1889 births
1948 deaths
Australian rules footballers from Victoria (Australia)
Essendon Football Club players